Secret Army may refer to:

 Secret Army (TV series), a BBC drama series
 Secret Army (novel), the third novel in Robert Muchamore's Henderson's Boys series
 Secret Army (Belgium), an organisation in the Belgian Resistance during World War II
 Secret Army (France), an organisation in the French Resistance during WW II
 Organisation armée secrète, a French dissident paramilitary organization during the Algerian War